Arthur Liebehenschel (25 November 1901 – 24 January 1948) was a commandant at the Auschwitz and Majdanek concentration camps during the Holocaust. After the war, he was convicted of war crimes by the Polish government and executed in 1948.

SS career
Liebehenschel was born on 25 November 1901 in Posen (now Poznań). He studied economics and public administration. Too young to serve in World War I, in 1919 he enrolled in the Freikorp "Grenzschutz Ost"; he served as a sergeant major in the German armed forces (Reichswehr) afterwards. In 1932, he joined the Nazi Party and in 1934 the SS, where he served in the  Death's Head Units. Liebehenschel became the adjutant in the Lichtenburg concentration camp, and two years later was transferred to the Concentration Camps Inspectorate in Berlin. In 1942, when the SS Main Economic and Administrative Office was founded, Liebehenschel was assigned to the Department D (Concentration Camps) as head of DI (Central Office).

On 1 December 1943, Liebehenschel was appointed commandant of Auschwitz I concentration camp, succeeding Rudolf Höss. While continuing mass executions, he made some minor "improvements" including removing the standing cells and halting the selections to gas chambers among regular prisoners. According to Hermann Langbein, a prisoner at Auschwitz infirmary: "in general one could establish that even those SS members who were very bloodthirsty before became a bit more reserved because they realized that their fanaticism would not necessarily be tolerated anymore." 

On 8 May 1944 Höss returned to Auschwitz replacing Liebehenschel, who was appointed commandant of the already emptied Majdanek camp on 19 May 1944, succeeding Martin Gottfried Weiss. The camp was evacuated because of the Soviet advance into German-occupied Poland. Liebehenschel relocated to Trieste, Italy to the office of Odilo Globocnik, the SS and Police Leader for Operational Zone Adriatic Coast (OZAK). Liebehenschel became head of the SS Manpower Office there.

Criminal conviction

At the war's end, Liebehenschel was arrested by the U.S. Army and extradited to Poland. After being convicted of crimes against humanity at the Auschwitz Trial in Kraków, he was sentenced to death and subsequently executed by hanging on 24 January 1948.

Family
Liebehenschel had one son and three daughters by his first wife, Gertrud, the youngest of whom, Barbara Cherish (born 1943), now lives in the United States. 

In 2009, Cherish published her book My Father, the Auschwitz Commandant, in which she outlined actions by Liebehenschel that improved the prisoners' lives, but also discussed his participation in a genocidal system. Together with another daughter, Antje, she was interviewed in 2002 by ZDF, the German television channel, about living with their father's guilt. Liebehenschel had a son by his second wife, Anneliese. Liebehenschel's first wife, whom he left during the war, suffered from mental health issues after the war and committed suicide in a hospital for the mentally ill in 1966.

References

1901 births
1948 deaths
Auschwitz trial executions
Holocaust perpetrators in Poland
Military personnel from Poznań
Majdanek concentration camp personnel
German people convicted of crimes against humanity
SS-Obersturmbannführer
People from the Province of Posen
Auschwitz concentration camp personnel
People extradited from Germany
People extradited to Poland
Waffen-SS personnel
Prisoners and detainees of the United States military
Executed Nazi concentration camp commandants